Jabarry Jesse Chandler (born 11 April 1994) is a Barbadian international footballer who plays as a forward for Paradise.

International career

Jabarry Chandler was first called up by the Barbados Under 17 squad in 2010 for their match against Grenada Under 17s. Chandler started and scored in 2 goals. He then went on to score 6 more goals in the next 7 matches.
Although Barbados Under 17's didn't qualify for the U17 World Cup, Chandler was the top scorer in the entire Concacaf region during qualifying, with 8 goals.

In 2014 Chandler made his first appearance for the Senior Barbados team against Jamaica in a 2-0 loss. He didn't play another game that year, but in 2015 he made 3 more appearances for the Barbados Men's team, scoring his first senior goal for Barbados against US Virgin Islands in a 4-0 World Cup Qualifying win.

International goals
Scores and results list the Barbados's goal tally first.

References

External links
 
 https://int.soccerway.com/players/jabarry-chandler/136725/

1994 births
Living people
Barbadian footballers
Barbados international footballers
Association football forwards
Paradise FC (Barbados) players
Pride of Gall Hill FC players